The Order of Military Merit (Hangul: 무공훈장) is the primary military decoration awarded by the South Korean government. It is awarded to a person who rendered "outstanding military services by participating in an action in time of war or in quasi-state of war or by performing his/her duty equivalent to combat, such as responding to the attack of an enemy in a contact area."

Grades
The Order of Military Merit is awarded in five classes and each of these has three grades. In descending order of rank, the classes are: Taeguk (태극), Eulji (을지), Chungmu (충무), Hwarang (화랑) en Inheon (인헌). Each class has a first, second or third grade, denoted respectively by a gold star (금색 별), silver star (실버 스타), or an unadorned ribbon.

Notable recipients

Taegeuk

 Douglas MacArthur – General of the Army, United States Army
 Chappy Hakim – Air Chief Marshal, Indonesian Air Force
 Conrado Yap – Captain, Philippine Expeditionary Forces to Korea (PEFTOK), Philippine Army
 Maximo Young – Major, Philippine Expeditionary Forces to Korea (PEFTOK), Philippine Army
 Young-Oak Kim – Colonel, United States Army
 Homer Litzenberg – General, United States Marine Corps
 William Westmoreland – General, United States Army
 Frank Fort Everest – General, United States Air Force
 Horace Robertson – Lieutenant General, Australian Army
 Raoul Magrin-Vernerey – Lieutenant General,(acting Lieutenant colonel) French Army
 Bill Speakman VC – Sergeant, British Army
 Lee Han-Lim – Lieutenant General, Republic of Korea Army
 Chung-Shik YIM - Republic of Korea Army
 Edward L Rowny – Lieutenant General of the Army, United States Army
 Chaplain Emil J. Kapaun - Captain, United States Army

Eulji

 Pham Van Dong – General, Armed Forces of the Republic of Vietnam
 Chesty Puller – Lieutenant General, United States Marine Corps
 William P. Yarborough – Lieutenant General, United States Army

Chungmu
 Han Moo-hyup – Major General, Republic of Korea Army
 Charles Billingslea – Major General, United States Army
 Alfredo M. Santos – General, Armed Forces of the Philippines
 James A. McDivitt – Brigadier General, United States Air Force
 Elmo R. Zumwalt, Jr. – Admiral, United States Navy
 Phan Hoa Hiep – General, Armed Forces Republic of Vietnam
 Denis Earp  - Lieutenant General, South African Air Force
 AG Rangaraj, MVC  - Lieutenant Colonel, Indian Army (60 Parachute Field Ambulance)
 NB Banerjee, MVC  - Major, Indian Army (60 Parachute Field Ambulance)
 KC Chopra  - Captain, Indian Army (60 Parachute Field Ambulance)
 HS Parmar  - Captain, Indian Army (60 Parachute Field Ambulance)

Hwarang
 Hugh M. Elwood – Lieutenant General, United States Marine Corps
 Wilbur F. Simlik – Major General, United States Marine Corps
 Alvin B. Conlin   - Captain, United States Army, KMAG 1951
 John M. Ballantyne  - Sergeant, United States Army, 31st Recon Company

Inheon
Yoon Jang-ho – (Ha-sa) Staff Sergeant, Republic of Korea Armed Forces

See also 
 Orders, decorations, and medals of South Korea

References

External links
 Images of the Order of Military Merit (in Korean with some English)

Military Merit, Order
Military Merit, Order